Caught in the Act of Love is the debut studio album by Dutch-English pop group Caught in the Act. It was released by ZYX Music on 19 June 1995 in German-speaking Europe.

Track listing
Adapted from album booklet.

Notes
 denotes additional producer

Charts

Weekly charts

Year-end charts

Certifications

Release history

References

1995 debut albums
Caught in the Act albums
Albums produced by Steve Mac